Oteng Oteng (born 9 January 1990) is an amateur boxer from Botswana who qualified for the 2012 Olympics. He was born in Mookane.

At the 2010 Commonwealth Games in Delhi he lost to Benson Gicharu Njangiru in the semifinal and won bronze.

At the 2011 All-Africa Games he won the rematch and the Flyweight title but at the 2011 World Amateur Boxing Championships he lost his second bout to eventual winner Misha Aloyan.

He also won the 2012 African Boxing Olympic Qualification Tournament.

At the 2012 Summer Olympics, Oteng was defeated by Puerto Rican Jeyvier Cintrón in the first round with a score of 14–12.

At the 2014 Commonwealth Games, he lost 0-3 to Reece McFadden in the quarterfinal of the men's flyweight.

References

External links
 

Living people
Flyweight boxers
Botswana male boxers
Boxers at the 2012 Summer Olympics
Boxers at the 2010 Commonwealth Games
Olympic boxers of Botswana
Commonwealth Games bronze medallists for Botswana
Boxers at the 2014 Commonwealth Games
1990 births
Commonwealth Games medallists in boxing
African Games gold medalists for Botswana
African Games medalists in boxing
Competitors at the 2011 All-Africa Games
Medallists at the 2010 Commonwealth Games